is a railway station on the JR Hokkaido Hakodate Main Line. It is located in Hakodate, Hokkaidō, Japan.

Station structure
The station has two platforms serving two tracks.
 Platforms

Kikyō Station is administered by Goryōkaku Station and operated by JR Hakodate Development Co., Ltd. Ordinary tickets, express tickets, and reserved-seat tickets for all JR lines are on sale.
 Business hours: 7:10 a.m. - 4:30 p.m. (closed on holidays)

Railway stations in Hakodate
Railway stations in Japan opened in 1902